Piskorovce is a village and municipality in Vranov nad Topľou District in the Prešov Region of eastern Slovakia.

History
In historical records the village was first mentioned in 1408.

Geography
The municipality lies at an altitude of 250 metres and covers an area of 7.671 km². It has a population of about 161 people.

References

External links
 

Villages and municipalities in Vranov nad Topľou District
Zemplín (region)